The Monthly Mirror was an English literary periodical, published from 1795 to 1811, founded by Thomas Bellamy, and later jointly owned by Thomas Hill and John Litchfield. It was published by Vernor & Hood from the second half of 1798.

The Mirror concentrated on theatre, in London and the provinces. The first editor for Hill was Edward Du Bois. From 1812 it was merged into the Theatrical Inquisitor.

Contributors
Thomas Batchelor
Sir John Carr
Leigh Hunt
Capel Lofft
Eliza Kirkham Mathews
Thomas Park
Horatio Smith
James Smith
John Taylor, writing opera "memoirs and sketches"
Henry Kirke White
Samuel Whyte 
Tate Wilkinson

Notes

1795 establishments in Great Britain
1812 disestablishments in the United Kingdom
Monthly magazines published in the United Kingdom
Defunct literary magazines published in the United Kingdom
Magazines published in London
Magazines established in 1795
Magazines disestablished in 1812
Theatre magazines